The First Decade is a compilation album by the Canadian rock band April Wine, released in 1989. It contains four previously unreleased tracks.

Track listing
All tracks written by Myles Goodwyn unless otherwise noted.
 "It's a Pleasure to See You Again" (G. Moffet) – *previously unreleased
 "Bad Side of the Moon" (Elton John, Bernie Taupin)
 "Drop Your Guns" (D. Henman)
 "Lady Run, Lady Hide" (M. Goodwyn, J. Clench)
 "Electric Jewels" (M. Goodwyn, J. Clench)
 "Cum Hear the Band"
 "Slow Poke"
 "The Whole World's Goin' Crazy"
 "Lovin' You"
 "Baby it's You" – *previously unreleased
 "Somebody Like You" – *previously unreleased
 "Am I in Love" – *previously unreleased
 "Forever for Now"
 "Wings of Love"
 "Marjorie"
 "Child's Garden"
 "Mama Laye"
 "Coming Right Down on Top of Me"

Personnel
 Myles Goodwyn – guitar, vocals, keyboards
 David Henman – guitar, vocals
 Gary Moffet – guitars, vocals
 Brian Greenway – guitar, vocals
 Jim Clench – bass, vocals
 Ritchie Henman – drums & percussion
 Jerry Mercer – drums & percussion, vocals

References

April Wine albums
1989 greatest hits albums
Albums produced by Myles Goodwyn
Aquarius Records (Canada) compilation albums